Charles François Antoine Morren (3 March 1807 in Ghent – 17 December 1858 in Liège), was a Belgian botanist and horticulturist, and Director of the Jardin botanique de l’Université de Liège.

Morren taught physics at Ghent University between 1831 and 1835. At the same time he studied medicine and graduated in 1835. He became Professor extraordinarius of botany at the University of Liège from 1835 to 1837, and full professor from 1837 to 1854.

Morren discovered that the vanilla flower is pollinated by the social and stingless Melipone bee, which occurs only in Mexico, obviating natural pollination in other countries. Hernán Cortés brought vanilla to Europe, but for more than 300 years the pollination mechanism remained a mystery. Morren was the first to discover a method for artificial pollination, which made it possible to cultivate vanilla in the French colonies.

Pollination of vanilla pods is required to make the plants produce the fruit from which the vanilla spice is obtained. In 1837, Charles François Antoine Morren discovered this fact and pioneered a method of artificially pollinating the plant. The method proved financially unworkable and was not deployed commercially. In 1841, Edmond Albius, a 12-year-old slave who lived on the French island of Réunion in the Indian Ocean, discovered that the plant could be hand-pollinated. Hand-pollination allowed global cultivation of the plant. Noted French botanist and plant collector Jean Michel Claude Richard falsely claimed to have discovered the technique three or four years earlier, but by the end of the 20th century, Albius was considered the true discoverer.

He was the father of Charles Jacques Édouard Morren. Morren and his son produced the journal La Belgique Horticole (35 volumes, 1851–1885).

Morren also coined the term phenology, which refers to the scientific discipline that studies the seasonal cycles of animals and plants.  Morren first used the term phenology in 1849 during a public lecture at the Academy of Brussels.  The first use of the term phenology in a scientific paper dates back to 1853 when Morren published “Souvenirs phénologiques de l’hiver 1852-1853” (“Phenological memories of the winter 1852-1853”).  This paper describes an exceptionally warm winter when plants exhibited unusually phenological patterns.

This botanist is denoted by the author abbreviation C.Morren when citing a botanical name.

Publications
Morren, C. (1838). Recherches sur le mouvement et l'anatomie du Stylidium graminifolium. Mem. Acad. Roy. Scien. et belles lett., Brux.
 Morren, C. (1853) Souvenirs phénologiques de l'hiver 1852–1853. Bulletin de l'Académie royale des Sciences, des Lettres et des Beaux-Arts de Belgique. Tome XX, 1e partie, pp. 160–186.

References

Demarée, G.R and T. Rutishauser.  2009. Origins of the word “phenology”.  Eos 90(34): 4.

Botanists with author abbreviations
19th-century Belgian botanists
Belgian horticulturists
1807 births
1858 deaths
Academic staff of Ghent University